Scraps of Time: 1928, A Song for Harlem is a 2007 book by Patricia McKissack about a girl, Lilly Belle, who spends the Summer of 1928 in Harlem attending a writers' workshop led by Zora Neale Hurston.

Reception
Booklist, reviewing A Song for Harlem, wrote "McKissack writes with empathy for the characters as well as a good eye for details that bring the period to life. Especially appripriate for aspiring writers, the themes of finding your voice and telling the truth resonate throughout this appealing chapter book." and the School Library Journal wrote "This easy-to-read novel has succinct chapters and sentences that, while simple, convey a feel for the characters and the time, and a vivid sense of place."

A Song for Harlem has also been reviewed by The Horn Book Magazine, and Kirkus Reviews.

It is a 2008 CCBC Choice.

References

2007 American novels
2007 children's books
American children's novels
Children's historical novels
American historical novels
Novels set in the historical United States
Novels set in Manhattan
Harlem in fiction
Fiction set in 1928
Books by Patricia McKissack
Viking Press books